The Saab 29 Tunnan, colloquially Flygande tunnan or just Tunnan   ("The barrel"), is a Swedish fighter that was designed and manufactured by Saab in the late 1940s. It was the second turbojet-powered combat aircraft to be developed in Sweden, the first being the Saab 21R, and it was the first Western European fighter to be produced with a swept wing post World War II, only being preceded in Western Europe as a whole by the Me 262 built during the war. Despite its rotund appearance, from which its name is derived, the J 29 was fast and agile and served effectively in both fighter and fighter-bomber roles into the 1970s.

Development
Sweden had fallen behind the rapid technical progress being made elsewhere, and Saab needed to catch up in terms of aerodynamics and jet propulsion. Accordingly, project "JxR" was initiated in late 1945 and requirements were drawn up in October 1945. A pair of proposals were presented by the Saab design team, led by Lars Brising. The first of these, codenamed R 101, nicknamed cigarren (the cigar) due to its shape, bore a strong resemblance to the American Lockheed P-80 Shooting Star. The second design, which was chosen, was the barrel-shaped design, codenamed R 1001, which proved to be both faster and more agile.

The R 1001 concept had a straight wing, but after the engineers obtained German swept-wing research data, it was given a 25 degree sweep. Information on swept-wings came through Switzerland and included drawings for the Messerschmitt P.1101, P.1110, P.1111 and P.1112. SAAB's project manager, Frid Wänström, collected these documents in 1945 from Messerschmitt engineers who escaped to Switzerland at the end of the War. Among them were engineer and aerodynamicist Hermann Behrbohm, who joined Saab's J 29 team. These documents clearly indicated delta and swept-wing designs "reduc[e] drag dramatically as the aircraft approached the sound barrier."

To make the wing as thin as possible, the undercarriage retracted into the fuselage, rather than the wings. Wind tunnel testing at the Swedish Royal University of Technology and by the National Aeronautical Research Institute also influenced its aerodynamics. These tests determined the required fuselage form to ensure it could attain the targeted critical Mach number, as well as supporting the use of a straight-through airflow to maximize thrust. Automatically locking leading edge slots, interconnected with the flaps, were also deemed necessary for lateral stability during take-off and landing. To further verify the swept wing, a Saab Safir was modified with a full-scale wing as the Saab 201.  The finalized design, incorporating the new information was drawn up in January 1946.

The original powerplant was to have been the de Havilland Goblin turbojet, however, in December 1945, the more powerful de Havilland Ghost became available. This was ideal as not only was the Ghost set up for a circular air intake, its diameter would fit within the planned fuselage. Following negotiations between de Havilland and Saab, the Ghost engine was selected to power the type.

Despite early doubts for the supply of an equivalent to the American 75S aluminium alloy, Svenska Metallverken was able to manufacture it, although significantly larger sections were used than typical for aircraft construction. The structure employed heavy frames and stressed skin to meet conflicting requirements on space, strength, rigidity and accessibility.

The Swedish Air Force requested verification of the performance and a production plan for the project in February 1946. In Autumn 1946, the Swedish Air Force formally ordered three prototypes, with the type designation J 29.
Static testing  of the full-scale mock-up revealed problems with pressure cabin leaks, and aileron behavior. A hydraulic system was installed to solve the latter issue. However these delayed the first flight until after the hoped for date of 1 August 1948.

The first flight by a Saab 29 prototype was on 1 September 1948, was made by S/L 'Bob' Moore, who was later the first managing director of Saab GB, UK. A problem with the landing gear affected the expected top speed of the aircraft. Following the flight, Moore described the aircraft as "on the ground an ugly duckling – in the air, a swift."  Because of the shape of its fuselage, the Saab J 29 quickly received the nickname Flygande Tunnan ("The Flying Barrel"), or Tunnan ("The Barrel") for short. While not appreciated by SAAB, its short form was eventually adopted officially.

Four prototypes were built for the test program. The first two lacked armament, carrying heavy test equipment in their place instead. The third was armed with four  cannons. Air brakes on the fuselage and on the wings behind the rear spar and both conventional and combined aileron/flap arrangements were tested. Flight tests revealed that the J 29 prototypes could exceed the maximum Mach number for which they had been designed and flight performance figures were typically in excess of predicted values.

Production commenced In 1948 and in May 1951, Bråvalla Wing (F 13) received  the first production aircraft.

The Tunnan was produced in five main variants.

The J 29A fighter was the first model to enter service, and was followed by the J 29B and J 29E fighters, and finally the afterburner-equipped J 29F fighter, which was the final variant built. There was also a dedicated reconnaissance variant, the S 29C. Between  1950 and 1956, 661 Tunnans were completed, the largest production run for any Saab aircraft.

Design

The Saab 29 Tunnan was the first Swedish aircraft to be specifically designed to use jet propulsion. Sweden's first jet fighter, the Saab 21R, had been modified from the piston-engined Saab 21. It is a small, chubby aircraft with a single round air intake in the nose, with the pilot under a bubble canopy directly above the air intake duct on the upper-forward section of the fuselage. It has a very thin mid-mounted moderately swept two-spar wing which is a single structure attached to the fuselage by four bolts. The undercarriage is hydraulically operated, and was designed to be suitable for use from rough airstrips. To improve pilot survivability, the Tunnan used an ejection seat Saab developed in 1943, with an explosive jettisoning system for the canopy.

The engine was bolted to the fuselage at three points and a special trolley was used to remove the engine for maintenance. The final version had an afterburner, the first successful one used with a British jet engine.

Improvements were made to the wing to incorporate a dog-tooth leading edge, raising the critical Mach number. From 1963 onwards, all frontline J 29Fs were equipped with AIM-9 Sidewinder infrared-seeking air-to-air missiles.

Operational history

Sweden

The J 29 was fast and agile, and set the world speed record on a  closed circuit in 1954 at 977 km/h (607.05 mph). Two S 29C (reconnaissance variant) additionally set an international speed record of 900.6 km/h (559.4 mph) over a  closed-circuit course in 1955.
 
The crash record in early service was poor, mainly due to the inexperience with swept-winged aircraft and the lack of a two-seat, dual control Tunnan trainer variant: this meant that Swedish fighter pilots could only be trained using two seat variants of the de Havilland Vampire (a straight-winged jet), before going solo in a Tunnan.  99 pilots were killed during military practice flights in Sweden.

In May 1967, the fighter versions of the Tunnan was retired from combat service; however, a number of aircraft were retained and reconfigured for use as countermeasures trainers and for target towing duties into the 1970s. In August 1976, the last official military flight was performed at the Swedish Air Force's 50th anniversary air show.

Austria

On 27 January 1961, the Swedish Government authorized the Air Board to sell 15 J 29F Tunnans to Saab for restoration and resale to the Austrian Air Force. In 1962, the sale of a further 15 J 29F aircraft to Austria was authorized. This second batch was modified so a camera pod could be installed in the port side of the nose of each aircraft, which required the removal of two cannons. The interchangeable camera pod could be exchanged in roughly 30 minutes, and the cameras could be redirected in flight from the cockpit. Due to the limitations of the 1955 Austrian State Treaty, these were never armed with air-to-air missiles. The Tunnan remained in Austrian Air Force service until 1972.

On 20 October 1964 at 9:48 a.m., two Austrian J 29Fs took off from the base in Linz (they belonged to the 2. Jagdbomber Staffel, the first Bu. No. 29559 "E" was piloted by Sergeant Johan Kemetinger, the second Bu. No. 29627 "L" was piloted by Staff Sergeant Alfred Erdler). In bad weather and a radio beacon mix-up, the pilots "smoked" and crossed the airspace of the then Czechoslovakia. Due to the bad weather, they could not even be intercepted by the emergency pair, who had to stay at the airport. The Austrian pilots thus got deep into the interior of the country and after finding that they had fuel for about the last 2 minutes of the flight, the pilots, believing that the field on which they landed was solid enough, landed in a field in the area of the village of Ořech in the Prague-West district. Coincidentally, just a few kilometres from the civilian Prague-Ruzyně airport. One machine lost its landing gear on landing, the other overturned on a ditch, the pilot was trapped and had to be rescued by people working in the field. Both pilots were returned to their homeland after two days. The planes followed them later by rail.

UN operations in the Congo

The Tunnan was the first Swedish jet aircraft to see combat. In response to an appeal by the United Nations (UN) for military support in September 1961, an initial force of five J 29Bs organized as the F 22 Wing of the Swedish Air Force, were stationed in the Republic of Congo as Sweden's contribution to a UN peacekeeping mission (ONUC). They were  subsequently reinforced by four more J 29Bs and two S 29C photo reconnaissance Tunnans in 1962.  The J 29s were the only combat aircraft operated on behalf of the UN. The Tunnans received UN identifying markings on their fuselages.

Most missions involved attacking ground targets with cannons and unguided rockets but no aircraft were lost in action despite heavy ground fire. The consensus of the crews and foreign observers was that the Tunnan's capabilities were exceptional. Their secessionist adversaries used a few Fouga Magisters and other aircraft with no air combat capabilities.

Swedish pilots refused some requests for close air support to ground troops, reasoning that the risk of civilian casualties was too high. In November 1962 the Swedish air commander refused a direct order to destroy the  secessionist's Fouga Magisters since they were unarmed.

The only aircraft lost was by a high-ranking officer who crashed during an aborted takeoff for a test flight. When ONUC ended in 1964, some of the Swedish aircraft were deliberately destroyed at their base, as they were no longer needed in Sweden, having been superseded by later variants, and the cost of returning them wasn't justified.

Variants

J 29
 Four prototypes built in 1948–50.
J 29A
 Fighter, 224 built from 1951 to 1954; later series had wing-mounted dive brakes moved to the fuselage, ahead of the main landing gear doors.
J 29B
 Fighter, 332 built 1953–55; featured 50% larger fuel capacity and underwing hardpoints to carry bombs, rockets and drop-tanks.
A 29B
 Same aircraft as the J 29B, when serving with attack units.
S 29C
 Reconnaissance ("S" was derived from Spaning; scouting or reconnaissance in Swedish), 76 built from 1954 through 1956; five cameras mounted in a modified nose (no armament was carried). Later modified with the improved wing design introduced on the J 29E.
J 29D
 Proposed fighter variant with afterburner. One proposal (alternative 2) fitted the type with 4x 30 mm Hispano HSS 825 guns. One J 29A (number 29137) trialed with 30 mm HSS 825 mockups in 1952. After trestle mount trials of the 30 mm HSS 825 in 1954 it was found that the weapon was unsafe and the idea to use it on the J 29D was scrapped. A single J 29D prototype was built to test the afterburning Ghost RM 2A turbojet with 27.5 kN (2,800 kgp/6,175 lbf) afterburning thrust. Ultimately converted to J 29 F standard.
J 29E
 Fighter, 29 built in 1955; introduced an improved wing design with a leading edge dogtooth to increase the critical Mach number.
J 29F
 Fighter, 308 aircraft converted from available stocks of B and E model airframes from 1954 to 1956; featured the afterburning Ghost and dog-tooth wing; all remaining aircraft were further modified in 1963 to carry a pair of US-designed AIM-9B Sidewinder heat-seeking air-to-air missiles, built by SAAB under license as the Rb 24.
J 29F (2. JaBoStaffel variant)
 Reconnaissance modification for Austrian J 29F's serving with 2. JaBoStaffel. The modification allowed for the replacement of the left side guns with cameras in a green housing.

Operators

Austrian Air Force
1. JaBoStaffel (1st fighter-bomber-squadron)
2. JaBoStaffel (2nd fighter-bomber-squadron)

Swedish Air Force
F 3 Malmslätt
F 4 Frösön
F 6 Karlsborg
F 7 Såtenäs
F 8 Barkarby
F 9 Säve
F 10 Ängelholm
F 11 Nyköping
F 12 Kalmar
F 13 Norrköping
F 15 Söderhamn
F 16 Uppsala
F 21 Luleå
 ONUC
Swedish Air Force
F 22 Congo

Surviving aircraft

 J 29F 29624 displayed at the Aeroseum in a cavern at Gothenburg/Säve airport.
 J 29F 29640 preserved at Midlands Air Museum, Coventry, UK
 J 29F 29665  at the Musée de l'Air located at the former Paris–Le Bourget Airport in France.
 J 29F 29566 on display at the Museum of Military History in Vienna, Austria

Specifications (Saab J 29F Tunnan)

See also

References

Citations

Bibliography

 Berns, Lennart and Robin Lindholm. "Saab J 29 Tunnan". International Air Power Review, volume 13/2004, pp. 152–73.
 Boyne, Walter J. Air Warfare: An International Encyclopedia, Volume 1. ABC-CLIO, 2002. .
 Erichs, Rolph et al. The Saab-Scania Story. Stockholm: Streiffert & Co., 1988. .
 Green, William and Gordon Swanborough. The Great Book of Fighters.  St. Paul, MAN: MBI Publishing, 2001. .
 Lombardi, Fiona. The Swiss Air Power: Wherefrom?  Whereto? vdf Hochschulverlag AG, 2007. .
 
 "Saab-29: Sweden's new jet fighter." Flight International, 4 May 1950. pp. 556–58.
 Taylor, John W.R. "Saab J 29."  Combat Aircraft of the World from 1909 to the present.  New York: G.P. Putnam's Sons, 1969. .
 This Happens in the Swedish Air Force (brochure). Stockholm: Information Department of the Air Staff, Flygstabens informationsavdelning, Swedish Air Force, 1983.
 Widfeldt, Bo. The Saab J 29. Leatherhead, Surrey, UK: Profile Publications Ltd., 1966.
 Wilson, Stewart. Combat Aircraft since 1945. Fyshwick, AU: Aerospace Publications, 2000. .
 Winchester, Jim. "Saab J 29".  Military Aircraft of the Cold War (The Aviation Factfile). Rochester, Kent, UK: The Grange, 2006. .

External links

 Military aviation: Swedish and worldwide
  Saab J 29 Tunnan
Me P.1101 similar German aircraft design
The Saab 29 Tunnan on Vectorsite.
The photo: only flying Saab J29F in Swedish colours is operated by heritage flight of the Flygvapnet (Swedish Air Force) - 2012.

29
1940s Swedish fighter aircraft
Single-engined jet aircraft
Aircraft first flown in 1948
Mid-wing aircraft